Mann's worm snake (Letheobia manni) is a species of blind snake in the family Typhlopidae. The species is endemic to West Africa.

Etymology
The specific name, manni, is in honor of William Montana Mann, who was an American entomologist and zoo director.

Geographic range
L. manni is found in Guinea and Liberia.

Reproduction
L. manni is oviparous.

References

Further reading
Loveridge, Arthur (1941). "Report on the Smithsonian-Firestone Expedition's collection of reptiles and amphibians from Liberia". Proc. United States Nat. Mus. 91: 113–139. (Typhlops manni, new species, p. 118).

manni
Reptiles described in 1941